David Mustard (born 29 December 1959) is a former professional tennis player from New Zealand.

Biography
Mustard played professionally on the Grand Prix tennis circuit during the 1980s and won an ATP Challenger tournament in Sutton in 1984. 

He twice made it past the first round of the Australian Open, mostly notably in 1984 when he gave eventual champion Mats Wilander a close contest in the second round, before losing in four sets. After winning the first set 6–1, Mustard was unable to repeat that performance in the second but had opportunities in the next two sets. He led Wilander 5–2 in the third set and 3–0 in the fourth, but the Swede was able to secure both sets and the match. 

His best performance in a Grand Slam tournament came in the 1985 Wimbledon Championships when he made the third round, as a qualifier. He defeated Stuart Bale and Marc Flur, before being eliminated by Kevin Curren.

As a doubles player, he had some success with British player Jonathan Smith. The pair made the round of 16 at the 1985 French Open and won two Challenger titles. His other Challenger title in doubles came with Russell Simpson, with whom he made the semi-finals at a Cleveland Grand Prix tournament in 1984. 

Mustard played in one Davis Cup tie for New Zealand, against Taiwan in Auckland in 1985, which the home side won 5-0. He defeated Hsu Huang-Jung in the first singles rubber and was also used in the doubles, with David Lewis.

He now works as a tennis coach in Herne Bay, Auckland.

Challenger titles

Singles: (1)

Doubles: (3)

See also
List of New Zealand Davis Cup team representatives

References

External links
 
 
 

1959 births
Living people
New Zealand male tennis players
Sportspeople from Lower Hutt